Marten Crag (‘Martenski Kamak’ \'mar-ten-ski 'ka-m&k\) is the rocky peak rising to 665 m between Stepup Col and the eastern foothills of Giovannini (Lobell) Ridge on Trinity Peninsula in Graham Land, Antarctica.  It is surmounting Broad Valley to the north and Cugnot Ice Piedmont to the southeast.

The peak is named after the town of Marten in Northeastern Bulgaria.

Location
German-British mapping in 1996.

Maps
 Trinity Peninsula. Scale 1:250000 topographic map No. 5697. Institut für Angewandte Geodäsie and British Antarctic Survey, 1996.
 Antarctic Digital Database (ADD). Scale 1:250000 topographic map of Antarctica. Scientific Committee on Antarctic Research (SCAR). Since 1993, regularly updated.

Notes

References
 Marten Crag. SCAR Composite Antarctic Gazetteer
 Bulgarian Antarctic Gazetteer. Antarctic Place-names Commission. (details in Bulgarian, basic data in English)

External links
 Marten Crag. Copernix satellite image

Rock formations of the Trinity Peninsula
Bulgaria and the Antarctic